Barry Davis (born January 8, 1968 in Hialeah, Florida) is a Canadian sportscaster formerly of Sportsnet and current host of the Outta The Park podcast.

Davis began his broadcasting career in 1992 as a Technical Operator at CJCL 1430 (currently 590 The FAN) based out of Toronto, Ontario.  In 2002, he became a reporter for the Toronto Maple Leafs at Sportsnet.  He would later go on to become a Toronto Blue Jays field reporter at Sportsnet and followed them on their latest playoff runs of 2015 and 2016.

In 2017, Davis left Sportsnet to pursue "new and exciting" opportunities. He began his own media company No Suit Required Media.  He currently hosts the Outta The Park podcast which airs three times a week and he has approximately 50,000 Twitter followers. Barry was also featured on prominent online podcast Kevys Country Breakfast.

Davis had two passions growing up, sports and music.  He is the lead singer and guitarist of a Tom Petty tribute band named We Ain't Petty. His band currently performs all over the Greater Toronto Area.

References

1968 births
Living people
Canadian television sportscasters
Major League Baseball broadcasters
People from Hialeah, Florida